Kappa Serpentis, Latinised from κ Serpentis, is a single, red-hued star in the constellation Serpens, in its head (Serpens Caput). It has the proper name Gudja  and the Flamsteed designation 35 Serpentis. This star is visible to the naked eye with an apparent visual magnitude of +4.09. It is located approximately 382 light years from the Sun, based on parallax, and is drifting closer with a radial velocity of −38 km/s.

This object is an aging red giant star with a stellar classification of M0.5III. After exhausting the supply of hydrogen at its core, the star cooled and expanded off the main sequence, and now has around 51 times the Sun's radius. It is radiating 628 times the luminosity of the Sun from its photosphere at an effective temperature of 4,033 K. This is a suspected variable star.

Nomenclature
κ Serpentis (Latinised to Kappa Serpentis) is the star's Bayer designation.

The star bore the traditional name  in the culture of the Wardaman people of the Northern territory of Australia, meaning 'water goanna'. In 2016, the IAU organized a Working Group on Star Names (WGSN) to catalog and standardize proper names for stars. The WGSN approved the name Gudja for this star on 10 August 2018 and it is now so included in the List of IAU-approved Star Names.

References

M-type giants
Suspected variables
Serpens (constellation)
Serpentis, Kappa
Durchmusterung objects
Serpentis, 35
141477
077450
5879